You Can Thank Me Later is a 1998 Canadian comedy-drama film directed by Shimon Dotan and starring Ellen Burstyn. The film is based on a play titled Hyper-Allergenic written and adapted for the screen by Oren Safdie.

Cast
Ellen Burstyn ...  Shirley Cooperberg
Amanda Plummer ...  Susan Cooperberg
Ted Levine ...  Eli Cooperberg
Mark Blum ...  Edward Cooperberg
Mary McDonnell ...  Diane
Geneviève Bujold ...  Joelle
Jacob Tierney ...  Simon Cooperberg
Roc LaFortune ...  TV Repairman
Macha Grenon ...  Linda
Geneviève Brouillette ...  Nurse
Dorothée Berryman ...  Art Patron

External links

1998 films
1990s English-language films
Canadian comedy-drama films
1998 comedy-drama films
Films directed by Shimon Dotan
English-language Canadian films
1990s Canadian films